Charles S. "Chas" Peterson (January 30, 1927 – May 10, 2017) was an American historian.  A member of the Church of Jesus Christ of Latter-day Saints (LDS Church) and a resident of Utah most of his life, he specialized in the history of his state and of the people of the LDS Church.

Biography
Peterson was born in Snowflake, Arizona in 1927.  Born into a Latter-day Saint family, he served in the U.S. Army (1945–46) and served on a church mission to Sweden (1947–49), where he worked with Ezra Taft Benson.  Upon the completion of his mission, he studied at Brigham Young University, graduating with a BA in 1953, the year of his marriage to Elizabeth "Betty" Hayes.  The couple had six children while Peterson continued his studies, earning an MA (BYU, 1958) and a PhD (Arizona State University, 1967). 

Peterson became a college-level teacher of Utah history, the director of the Utah State Historical Society, and the editor of the Society's Utah Historical Quarterly.  He was the author of Utah: A Bicentennial History, a sociopolitical history of Utah published in 1977.  He died in St. George, Utah in 2017.

References

1927 births
2017 deaths
Historians from Utah
People from Snowflake, Arizona
United States Army soldiers
American Mormon missionaries in Sweden
Brigham Young University alumni
Arizona State University alumni
Latter Day Saints from Utah